Text corpora (singular: text corpus) are large and structured sets of texts, which have been systematically collected. Text corpora are used by corpus linguists and within other branches of linguistics for statistical analysis, hypothesis testing, finding patterns of language use, investigating language change and variation, and teaching language proficiency.

English language 
American National Corpus
Bank of English
BookCorpus
British National Corpus
Bergen Corpus of London Teenage Language (COLT)
Brown Corpus, forming part of the "Brown Family" of corpora, together with LOB, Frown and F-LOB
Corpus of Contemporary American English (COCA) 425 million words, 1990–2011. Freely searchable online
Corpus Resource Database (CoRD), more than 80 English language corpora.
Coruña Corpus, a corpus of late Modern English scientific writing covering the period 1700–1900, developed by the Muste research group at the University of A Coruña
DBLP Discovery Dataset (D3), a corpus of computer science publications with sentient metadata.
GUM corpus, the open source Georgetown University Multilayer corpus, with very many annotation layers
Google Books Ngram Corpus
International Corpus of English
Oxford English Corpus
RE3D (Relationship and Entity Extraction Evaluation Dataset)
Santa Barbara Corpus of Spoken American English
Scottish Corpus of Texts & Speech
Strathy Corpus of Canadian English

European languages 
CETENFolha
The Corpus of Electronic Texts
Corpus Inscriptionum Insularum Celticarum (CIIC), covering Primitive Irish inscriptions in Ogham
Google Books Ngram Corpus
The Georgian Language Corpus
Thesaurus Linguae Graecae (Ancient Greek)
Eastern Armenian National Corpus (EANC) 110 million words. Freely searchable online.
Spanish text corpus by Molino de Ideas, which contains 660 million words.
CorALit: the Corpus of Academic Lithuanian Academic texts published in 1999–2009 (approx. 9 million words). Compiled at the University of Vilnius, Lithuania
Reference Corpus of Contemporary Portuguese (CRPC)
 Turkish National Corpus
CoRoLa - The Reference Corpus of the Contemporary Romanian Language (Corpus reprezentativ al limbii române contemporane )
TS Corpus - A large set of Turkish corpora. TS Corpus is a Free&Independent Project that aims to build Turkish corpora, NLP tools and linguistic datasets...
MacMorpho - an annotated corpus of Brazilian Portuguese text

Slavic

East Slavic 
Belarusian N-korpus
Russian National Corpus
General Internet Corpus of Russian
 General regionally annotated corpus of Ukrainian
 Ukrainian Language Corpus on the Mova.info Linguistic Portal
 Ukrainian Language Corpus
 Araneum Russicum
 Russian Corpus of Biographical Texts
 RuTweetCorp
 RusAge: Corpus for Age-Based Text Classification

South Slavic 
Bulgarian National Corpus
Macedonian Electronic Corpus
Croatian Language Corpus
Croatian National Corpus
Slovenian National Corpus

West Slavic 
Czech National Corpus
National Corpus of Polish

German 
German Reference Corpus (DeReKo) More than 4 billion words of contemporary written German.
Free corpus of German mistakes from people with dyslexia

Middle Eastern Languages 
Corpus Inscriptionum Semiticarum
Kanaanäische und Aramäische Inschriften
Hamshahri Corpus (Persian)
Persian in MULTEXT-EAST corpus (Persian)
Amarna letters (for Akkadian, Egyptian, Sumerogram's, etc.)
TEP: Tehran English-Persian Parallel Corpus
TMC: Tehran Monolingual Corpus, Standard corpus for Persian Language Modeling
PTC: Persian Today Corpus: The Most Frequent Words of Today Persian, based on a one-million-word corpus (in Persian: Vāže-hā-ye Porkārbord-e Fārsi-ye Emrūz), Hamid Hassani, Tehran, Iran Language Institute (ILI), 2005, 322 pp. 
Kurdish-corpus.uok.ac.ir (Kurdish-corpus Sorani dialect) University of Kurdistan, Department of English Language and Linguistics
Bijankhan Corpus A Contemporary Persian Corpus for NLP researches, University of Tehran, 2012
Neo-Assyrian Text Corpus Project
Quranic Arabic Corpus (Classical Arabic)
Electronic Text Corpus of Sumerian Literature
Open Richly Annotated Cuneiform Corpus
Asosoft text corpus – Central Kurdish (Sorani)

Devanagari 
Nepali Text Corpus (90+ million running words/6.5+ million sentences)

East Asian Languages 
Kotonoha Japanese language corpus
LIVAC Synchronous Corpus (Chinese)

South Asian Languages 
 SinMin dataset (Sinhala)

Parallel corpora of diverse languages 
Chinese/English Political Interpreting Corpus (CEPIC)  consists of transcripts of speeches delivered by top political figures from Hong Kong, Beijing, Washington DC and London, as well as their translated/interpreted texts. Developed by Jun Pan and HKBU Library.
Europarl Corpus - proceedings of the European Parliament from 1996 to 2012
EUR-Lex corpus - collection of all official languages of the European Union, created from the EUR-Lex database
OPUS: Open source Parallel Corpus in many many languages
Tatoeba A parallel corpus which contains over 8.9 million sentences in multiple languages; 107 languages have more than 1,000 sentences each; a further 81 languages have from 100 to 1,000 sentences each.
NTU-Multilingual Corpus in 7 languages (ara, eng, ind, jpn, kor, mcn, vie) (legacy repo)
SeedLing corpus - A Seed Corpus for the Human Language Project with 1000+ languages from various sources.
 GRALIS parallel texts for various Slavic languages, compiled by the institute for Slavic languages at Graz University (Branko Tošović et al.)
 The ACTRES Parallel Corpus (P-ACTRES 2.0) is a bidirectional English-Spanish corpus consisting of original texts in one language and their translation into the other. P-ACTRES 2.0 contains over 6 million words considering both directions together.

Comparable Corpora 
 Corpus of Political Speeches contains four collections of political speeches in English and Chinese from The Corpus of U.S. Presidential Speeches (1789–2015), The Corpus of Policy Address by Hong Kong Governors (1984–1996) and Hong Kong Chief Executives (1997–2014), The Corpus of Speeches given on New Year's days and Double Tenth days by Taiwan Presidents (1978–2014), and The Corpus of Report on the Work of the Government by Premiers of the People's Republic of China (1984–2013). Developed by HKBU Library.
WaCky - The Web-As-Corpus Kool Yinitiative Web as Corpus (eng, fre, deu, ita)
 Disambiguating Similar Language Corpora Collection (DSLCC) (Bosnian, Croatian, Serbian, Indonesian, Malay, Czech, Slovak, Brazilian Portuguese, European Portuguese, Peninsular Spanish, Argentine Spanish)
 Wikipedia Comparable Corpora (41 million aligned Wikipedia articles for 253 language pairs)
 The TenTen Corpus Family – comparable web corpora of target size 10 billion words. These corpora are available in the corpus management system Sketch Engine, currently, there exist TenTen corpora for more than 30 languages (such as English TenTen corpus, Arabic TenTen corpus, Spanish TenTen corpus, Russian Tenten corpus,). The overview of existing TenTen corpora can be found at https://www.sketchengine.co.uk/documentation/tenten-corpora/
 Timestamped JSI web corpora – web corpora of news articles crawled from a list of RSS feeds. Newsfeed corpora are being prepared in the framework of the project implemented by the Jožef Stefan Institute at Slovenian scientific research institute. and published in Sketch Engine. More information about the project is on the project websites.

L2 (English) Corpora 

 Cambridge Learner Corpus
Corpus of Academic Written and Spoken English (CAWSE), a collection of Chinese students’ English language samples in academic settings. Freely downloadable online.  
English as a Lingua Franca in Academic Settings (ELFA), an academic ELF corpus.
International Corpus of Learner English (ICLE), a corpus of learner written English.
Louvain International Database of Spoken English Interlanguage (LINDSEI), a corpus of learner spoken English.
Trinity Lancaster Corpus, one of the largest corpus of L2 spoken English.
University of Pittsburgh English Language Institute Corpus (PELIC)
Vienna-Oxford International Corpus of English (VOICE), an ELF corpus.

References

Corpus linguistics
Natural language processing
Linguistics lists